Vought Corsair is the name of several former aircraft of the US Navy:

Vought O2U Corsair, a biplane scout and observation aircraft
Vought O4U Corsair, a biplane scout and observation aircraft prototype
Vought SBU Corsair, a biplane dive bomber aircraft
Vought F4U Corsair, a monoplane shipborne fighter/dive bomber aircraft
LTV A-7 Corsair II, a single-seat light jet attack aircraft